Eleutherodactylus minutus,  also known as the Hispaniolan wheeping frog, is a species of frog in the family Eleutherodactylidae endemic to the Cordillera Central, Dominican Republic, at elevations of  asl. Its common name is tiny robber frog. Its natural habitats are mesic upland broadleaf or pine forests. In suitable habitat it is moderately common. It is threatened by habitat loss caused by agriculture.

References

minutus
Endemic fauna of the Dominican Republic
Amphibians of the Dominican Republic
Taxa named by Gladwyn Kingsley Noble
Amphibians described in 1923
Taxonomy articles created by Polbot